Facchinetti is an Italian surname. Notable people with the surname include:

 Alessandra Facchinetti (born 1972), Italian fashion designer
 Cesare Facchinetti (1608–1683), Italian Catholic cardinal
 Cipriano Facchinetti (1889–1952), Italian politician and minister of defence (1947-1948)
 Francesco Facchinetti (born 1980), Italian DJ, producer, singer, musician and TV presenter
 Giovanni Facchinetti, birth name of Pope Innocent IX (1519–1591)
 Mickaël Facchinetti (born 1991), Swiss footballer
 Paolo Facchinetti (born 1984), Italian footballer
 Roby Facchinetti (born 1944), a member of the Italian pop band Pooh

Italian-language surnames